Tharindu Weerasinghe (born 29 April 1983) is a Sri Lankan cricketer. He made his first-class debut on 7 November 2003, for Police Sports Club in the 2003–04 Premier Trophy.

References

External links
 

1983 births
Living people
Sri Lankan cricketers
Negombo Cricket Club cricketers
Sri Lanka Police Sports Club cricketers
Place of birth missing (living people)